Anna Ní Ghallachair (Anne Gallagher), Irish academic and scholar.

A native of Árainn Mhór, Tír Chonaill, Ní Ghallachair taught English in the universities of Bordeaux and Rennes, and both Irish and English at Brest. She has also been the director of the Language Centre, National University of Ireland, Maynooth, and chairperson of Údarás na Gaeltachta.

Selected bibliography

 Living Language: aspects of linguistic contact and identity (ed.), Dublin, 1997
 Language Education in Ireland: current practice and future needs (eds. with Muris O Laoire), Dublin, 2006

External links
 http://www.udaras.ie/en/faoin-udaras/struchtur-foireann/an-bord/anna-ni-ghallchoir/
 https://www.maynoothuniversity.ie/larionad-gaeilge-centre-irish-language/our-people/anne-gallagher-anna-n-ghallachair#3
 https://www.ria.ie/anna-ni-ghallachair

Linguists from Ireland
Irish-language writers
Academics of Maynooth University
Living people
20th-century Irish women writers
21st-century Irish women writers
Year of birth missing (living people)